Cruising is a novel written by New York Times reporter Gerald Walker and published in 1970. The novel is about an undercover policeman looking for a homosexual serial killer in the gay New York City of 1970 before S/M and leather subcultures became well known (they existed but not to the extent they were portrayed in the film). The murder victims were closeted or relatively open (as open as they could be at the time) men who came across the killer while "cruising" for sex. While working undercover, the policeman develops feelings for his gay neighbor.

The novel is a standout for the era it was written in, there were not many gay narratives explored. Joseph Hansen was one other writer of the 1970s to incorporate queerness into his crime fiction with his Brandstetter detective series, the first emergence of gay crime fiction was owed to George Baxt, who wrote about the gay detective Pharaoh Love. Hansen, Nava, Zubro and Nathan Aldyne (a pseudonym for Michael Mcdowell and Dennis Schuetz) were authors of crime fiction who also incorporated gay themes into their writing in the 1970-1980's around the time Gerald Walker had written this novel. Neil Placky presents the view ‘Their books opened doors into gay culture at a time when homosexuality was considered a psychiatric disorder and a sure way to break a mother’s heart’. In Gerald Walker's Cruising the novel explores the main character's identity as an undercover officer and the internal struggle he then faces by entering the S/M culture of the gay community as a key point of the plot. The novel's plot displays the varying attitudes toward the emerging gay community. In a review published in The Guardian, a year after Cruising had been published, the reviewer explains ‘Cruising was Gerald Walker’s first novel. It took five years to write [...] and of course was turned down by six literary agents and no less than 18 publishers’. There was a dismissive reception of Walker's novel in the 1970s.

Plot
The novel focuses on three main characters, the killer Stuart Richards, the undercover policeman John Lynch, and the policeman Captain Edelson, who assigns the undercover role to Lynch. Each chapter (20 in total) focuses on one of the character's thoughts. Focus is placed on Lynch's feelings about various minority groups, including gay men and his feelings related to working undercover and how his life is changing as the job progresses. Additional focus is Richard's various heterosexual exploits, his rocky relationship with his father and many more memories of his life, both past and current, and Edelson's thoughts on the case and how he hopes it will garner him a promotion if he solves it.

Film adaptation
The novel was adapted as the 1980 film, also titled Cruising. There were substantial changes to the plot of the film, such as moving the killer into the world of sadomasochism and leather gay bars in Greenwich Village, New York. The movie includes the policeman Steve Burns (his name was changed from John Lynch) having an active sexual relationship with his girlfriend Nancy (played by Karen Allen). Neither of these facets are part of the plot of the novel. The film starred Al Pacino and was directed by William Friedkin.

References

1970 American novels
American crime novels
Novels set in New York City
American novels adapted into films
American LGBT novels
Novels about serial killers
Novels with gay themes
Stein and Day books
English-language novels
1970s LGBT novels